Jeevan Reddy may refer to:
 Asannagari Jeevan Reddy (born 1976), Indian politician, MLA from Armur Assembly constituency
 B. Jeevan Reddy, Indian film director
 T. Jeevan Reddy, Indian politician, MLA from Jagtial Assembly constituency